Cerro El Reformador is a hill located in El Progreso, Guatemala. The hill is covered with dry shrubland and offers a panoramic point view of the surrounding landscape.

A small area of 0.6 km2 was declared a national park in 1955.

References

National parks of Guatemala
Protected areas established in 1955
1955 establishments in Guatemala